A Family Lost is a 2007 television film starring Cynthia Gibb, Nicole Muñoz, and Zak Santiago. It's about criminals who try to track a mother and diabetic daughter who survived a plane crash and carry stolen information. The film was released on March 11, 2007, and aired on the Lifetime Network. It was written by Boon Collins and Gilbert Shilton, and directed by John Fasano.

References

External links
 
 

2007 television films
2007 films
American television films
Films directed by John Fasano